Illawarra is region in New South Wales, Australia.

Illawarra may also refer to:

 Illawarra (spider), a genus of spider
 Illawarra cattle, breed of dairy cattle
 Illawarra Coke Company, in Coalcliff and Coledale, New South Wales, Australia
 Illawarra escarpment, south of Sydney, Australia
 Illawarra Flame Tree, a species of tree scientifically classified as Brachychiton acerifolius
 Illawarra Hawks, a National Basketball League team
 Illawarra Mercury, a daily newspaper serving the Illawarra region
 Illawarra Steelers, the half of the St. George Illawarra Dragons (referred to above) joint venture that originates from the Illawarra region of New South Wales
 Lake Illawarra, near Wollongong, New South Wales, Australia

See also
 Eastern Suburbs & Illawarra Line, a suburban railway line in Sydney, Australia
 Illawarra railway line, an intercity railway line in New South Wales, Australia
 St George Illawarra Dragons, Australian rugby league football team
 SS Lake Illawarra, bulk carrier that collided with a pylon on Tasman Bridge in 1975